Nealyda bougainvilleae is a moth of the family Gelechiidae. It was described by Hering in 1955. It is found in Argentina.

References

Moths described in 1955
Nealyda